Karma (Xuân Cao Mạnh) is a superheroine appearing in American comic books published by Marvel Comics. Created by Chris Claremont and Frank Miller, the character first appeared in Marvel Team-Up #100 (December 1980). She is mostly in association with The X-Men.

She belongs to the subspecies of humans called mutants, who are born with superhuman abilities. Karma is endowed with the ability to seize control of another's mind, though she has sometimes been depicted with other more extensive psionic abilities. The origin of the character relates to the Vietnam War, as she and her family were among the boat people fleeing the country shortly after the advent of Communism and in the wake of violence. Her Vietnamese origin contributes to two of her main traits—her Catholicism and her mastery of the French language, both of which stem from France's strong historical influence in Vietnam. Karma, in fact, speaks English with a French accent rather than a Vietnamese one.

Karma was one of the five founding members of the New Mutants, along with Cannonball, Mirage, Sunspot and Wolfsbane. Being several years older than the others, and the legal guardian of her siblings from a young age, she was the most mature member, and the only one in the original lineup who was introduced in published comics before the team itself. Karma is one of the first major lesbian characters in a mainstream comic book.

Publication history
Karma first appears in Marvel Team-Up #100 (December 1980). She joins the New Mutants as a founding member in Marvel Graphic Novel #4 (1982) and appears as a regular cast member in New Mutants from issues #1–6 (1983) and issues #29–54 (1985–87), in which she leaves the team to search for her kidnapped siblings. Her search brings her to Madripoor, and she guest stars in Wolverine volume 2 issues #4–8 (1989) and #27–30 (1990).

In 1994, she appears in the Child's Play crossover between X-Force and The New Warriors, and features in three limited series: Beast #1–3 (1997), New Mutants: Truth or Death #1–3 (1997–98) and Mekanix (2002–03). In New Mutants volume 2, she returns to the X-Mansion as a faculty member and continues to appear irregularly as a supporting character when that title was relaunched as New X-Men.

After M-Day, Karma retains her powers, and joins the main X-Men team when they relocate to Utopia. She is assigned to the New Mutants team of the X-Men and features in New Mutants vol. 3 issues #1–28, after which she leaves Utopia for the Jean Grey School as part of the Schism. Karma then serves with Wolverine's X-Men and is featured in Astonishing X-Men volume 3, starting with issue #49.

Character name 
When Karma was introduced in Marvel Team-Up #100, her name was given as "Xi'an Coy Manh". In Love Unlimited Infinity Comic #31, published on January 5, 2023, the character's name was revised to "Xuân Cao Mạnh", or "Mạnh Cao Xuân" using Vietnamese naming order. Love Unlimited Infinity Comic #31 was written and illustrated by Vietnamese-American cartoonist Trung Le Nguyen, who explained the rationale for the change:

Fictional character biography

Introduction
Xuân (pronounced "Swun", but nicknamed "Shan") Cao Mạnh was born in the central highlands of Vietnam. Xuân's origins are rooted in tragedy. Her father was a colonel in the South Vietnamese army who was forced to bring his wife and four children on missions. When Xuân's twin brother, Tran Cao Mạnh, was attacked by a Viet Cong soldier, Xuân's power of mind possession emerged to protect him. Tran soon exhibited the identical power, although he relished using it cruelly. While Tran was rescued from the throes of war by their crime lord uncle, General Nguyen Ngoc Cao, Xuân's father was shot and killed during the fall of Saigon. Xuân escaped on a cramped boat with hundreds of others, including her mother and her younger brother and sister, Leong and Nga. The boat was boarded by Thai pirates on the way to the United States; Xuân and her mother were raped by the pirates and her mother died shortly thereafter.

Arriving in New York City, a program to help Vietnamese immigrants run by the Catholic priest Father Michael Bowen (Dagger's uncle) helped Xuân find work and an apartment. However, General Cao insisted she use her powers in his service, as Tran was already doing, and kidnapped Leong and Nga when she refused. Possessing Spider-Man, she attempted to use him to reclaim the children from a party her uncle was holding. The Fantastic Four intervened. Tran, not realizing Xuân was in control of Spider-Man, forced her out of Spider-Man's mind in possessing him long enough for the Thing to knock him out. With technical aid from Professor X, the Fantastic Four and Spider-Man located Xuân. After an initial misunderstanding, they agreed to help her reclaim the children, but Tran possessed the Fantastic Four and set them against Spider-Man. Spider-Man was outmatched by Tran's ability to use the Fantastic Four as a single cohesive force due to his greater experience with his powers. Xuân finally lashed out and bested Tran in a psychic battle, absorbing him completely and permanently imprisoning him within her soul, taking the name Karma afterwards. Her powers doubled after absorbing and imprisoning Tran inside her soul.

New Mutants
Reed Richards refers Karma to Professor X, and she becomes his first recruit for his new team of mutant teenagers, the New Mutants. Karma had been working a full-time job to support herself and her siblings, and so agrees to work as Xavier's secretary to help him run the school in return for a generous salary.

During an attack by the Sentinels, the other New Mutants begin implicitly following Karma as their leader. During a fight with Viper and the Silver Samurai, the mutant psychic entity Amahl Farouk takes Karma as a host body. She disappears and the rest of the team fears her to be dead. Possessed by Farouk, she becomes a crime boss and runs a gladiatorial arena. She becomes grossly obese while possessed, as Farouk was a large eater in life and had continued his voracity when using Karma's body. When two of the New Mutants (Sunspot and Magma) are forced to participate in the high-stakes gladiatorial competition, she comes into conflict with her old teammates.

The New Mutants pursue her and ultimately drive Farouk to flee from Karma's body, and she defeats him in psychic combat. The New Mutants and Storm take a vacation on a small Grecian island. There they are abducted by the Enchantress. Magik attempts to teleport everyone away, but her teleport disc collides with the barrier around the Enchantress's castle, and they are tossed all over Asgard. Karma ends up in a desert wasteland and, still despondent at her obesity, she decides to lay down and die. However, the Norns intervene and place a young child near her, compelling Karma to survive in order to help the child out of the desert. Karma and the child live in the desert for months, using her powers to stun the wildlife for food, and scavenging weapons and shelter from travelers who have perished in the wasteland. By the time she reaches the end of the desert and reunites with the other New Mutants, she has shed her excess weight and her hair had grown to waist-length. When Loki returns the New Mutants and X-Men to Earth, although he undoes most of their transformations — such as Moonstar having become a Valkyrie and thus inherited a winged steed — he ensures that Karma retains her new slimmer physique. After an encounter with — and temporary death at the hands of — the Beyonder, she and her fellow New Mutants are briefly transferred to the Massachusetts Academy and join the Hellions.

Father Bowen, Karma's confessor, cared for Leong and Nga during Karma's absence, but she resumes caring for the youths upon her return to the New Mutants, living in a small apartment on Mạnhattan's Lower East Side. During the Mutant Massacre, Leong and Nga fail to turn up at home after leaving school. The Xavier School's headmaster, Magneto, is unable to locate the missing children, even with the resources of the Hellfire Club at his disposal. Believing her uncle has a better chance of finding them, Karma leaves the New Mutants to return to General Cao's service in exchange for his help.

Searching for Leong and Nga
In Madripoor, she works to help her uncle establish himself as one of the nation's two major crime lords. After the X-Man Wolverine appeals to her conscience, she begins covertly acting against Cao when his actions threaten innocent lives. General Cao strings Karma along for several months with promises of finding the children, but after he and some of his associates orchestrate the massacre of an entire village, she breaks her ties with him.

Karma continues her search independently, and learns the children were abducted by Shinobi Shaw and sold to Viper and Spiral, intent on sending the children through the "Body Shoppe". With the aid of Cannonball and Beast, Karma finally locates and frees Leong and Nga, while learning that her brother's essence is still alive, though dormant, within her.

Karma reunites with the original New Mutants when they meet their past selves traveling to the present. Karma evidences expanded telepathic powers, specifically removing the memories of the older New Mutants from the minds of the younger ones by briefly possessing them. Karma later meets many New Mutants friends, in the form of X-Force, at a desert rave, where she drastically altered her appearance with dyed hair, body piercings, and revealing clothing; a surprising difference to the image held by many of her former teammates.

She moves to Chicago with Leong and Nga and takes a job as a librarian for the University of Chicago while attending classes. There, she runs into Shadowcat and assists her in her mission against the anti-mutant hate group, Purity, while also hinting at a same sex attraction to her. Not long after, she came out as gay.

Teacher at Xavier's

Months afterwards, Danielle Moonstar, another ex-New Mutant, drops by the University of Chicago while trying to recruit Prodigy to the renamed Xavier Institute. Karma decides to return to Xavier's, where she serves as the librarian and French teacher. She is specifically chosen as a mentor by the younger student Anole, and later is mentor to all students less than fifteen years of age (thus too young to be assigned to squads). She returns to a more modest appearance and attire to better reflect her new position.

When Rahne Sinclair leaves the Xavier Institute due to a romance with a younger student, her position as advisor of the Paragons squad is left to Karma. Upon the (temporary) death of Northstar, Karma also becomes the advisor to his squad, the Alpha Squadron. Magma eventually takes over duties as the advisor of the Paragons, yet that still leaves Karma as the librarian, French teacher, and advisor to the Lower School and Alpha Squadron.

Karma retains her powers after M-Day. The school's population is drastically reduced and the squad system is abolished. She continues to reside at the Xavier Institute for Higher Learning, though she is not part of an X-Men team.

She is present when Apocalypse returns and tries to stop some of the 198 from accepting his offer to join him.

Manifest Destiny
Karma moves to Utopia along with the X-Men and trains with Emma Frost in the use of her powers and the control of her emotions. She serves with the X-Men on several missions, including acting as bait to lure out the Hellfire Cult and opposing the Sisterhood in its attempt restore Psylocke to her original body.

Reforming the New Mutants
Karma accompanies Mirage to a small Colorado town to investigate reports of a dangerous young mutant. After they turn up missing, Cannonball obtains permission from Cyclops to track them down, teaming up with old New Mutants members Magma, Sunspot and Magik, who reappeared at the X-Men's base after teleporting off into the future after the events of "X-Infernus". Magik informs Cannonball and Sunspot that Karma and Mirage are in danger which would result in their deaths. As it turns out, Karma's consciousness is trapped inside Legion's mind, and she is ultimately rescued by Magik with the aid of her Soulsword.

Due to their success in reining in the dangerous Legion, Karma and the other former New Mutants on the mission are sanctioned as an X-Men squad by Cyclops.

Utopia
Karma is seen during the riots in San Francisco with Armor, Match, Angel, and Bling trying to keep calm. She tells Nekra and Frenzy to behave when Ms. Marvel blasts the duo, taking them out.

In the aftermath of Utopia, Xuân goes to see Kavita Rao with Magik where they inform her of what went on in Legion's mind. When Kavita mistakes Marci for one of Legion's personalities, Xuân corrects her and reveals that Marci was a real person but when she exited his mind, Legion revealed Marci does not have a body to return to and explains how his powers work. She then reveals that one of Legion's personalities killed her after she bought Legion water and played together when he got back from the Age of Apocalypse. Feeling angry, Illyana offers her soulsword to Xuân who kills the alternate personality. However Xuân lies to Kavita about what happened as does Magik, both claiming Magik killed him.

Second Coming
Karma is sent with her teammates to engage The Right and Cameron Hodge at his facility. During the battle, she attempts to take psionic control of Hodge, but he proves immune to her powers and impales her through the leg with his metal pincer blades. Hodge is defeated, but as a result of her injuries, Karma loses her left leg just above the knee. She then gets a new prosthetic leg from Madison Jeffries.

Schism/Regenesis
Following the events of the Age of X, Karma leaves the New Mutants squad to focus on rehabilitating Face. Like many other mutants, Karma leaves Utopia for Westchester after the Schism, where she joins a team of X-Men under Wolverine.

Astonishing X-Men
Karma joins an ad hoc team of X-Men who find themselves under attack by the Marauders. The Marauders are controlled by Susan Hatchi, a successful weapons developer who wished to test out new nanotechnology that her company had developed.

After seizing control of Karma, it is revealed that Hatchi also had ulterior personal reasons for targeting the mutant. Born Da'o Cao Mạnh, she is the illegitimate half-sister of Karma. Da'o's mother had sought out their father for protection and for Da'o to be recognized as his daughter. Instead, he shot and killed her mother. He then abandons Da'o to work at a sweatshop. Da'o eventually manifested low-level telepathic powers, changed her name and began building her weapons development company. She later discovered that their father had used his influence to smuggle his legitimate family to the U.S., which made her resentment grow. This was further compounded when her powers were lost during M-Day.

In a later confrontation with the X-Men, Hatchi uses her nanotechnology to seize control of the team and orders them to takeover Madripoor or she will use her technology on New York and kill the population. She wants to not only demonstrate the effectiveness of her weapon but to draw out their father from hiding by publicly using Karma as bait. While she is able to locate her father in Madripoor, the X-Men are able to counteract the technology. Karma uses her own mutant abilities to forge a psychic link with her half-sister and show her the struggles she's had in her own life, despite the fact that their father acknowledged her. While the two sisters reach reconciliation, their father takes advantage of their engagement and shoots Hatchi. He is arrested by the police for her murder. After Hatchi's death, Karma inherits her company as the only eligible relative of age and effectively becomes a billionaire.

Karma later appears as a member of the Utopians alongside Elixir, Madison Jeffries, Masque, Random, and Boom-Boom, seeking peace in the former X-Men's base at Utopia.

Dead Souls
In the "New Mutants: Dead Souls" miniseries,  Karma enlists the aid of former new mutants Magik, Rictor, Wolfsbane and Boom-Boom plus Strong Guy to investigate a paranormal threat, using the Hatchi Corporation resources and influence at her disposal. In fact, Karma's brother, Tran Cao Mạnh, believed to be long dead when absorbed by Karma,  is revealed to have existed as a psychic being and sought revenge against his sister. During the confrontation, Karma, along with Magik, Strong Guy and Wolfsbane, were infected by Warlock's techno-organic virus and absorbed into a Phalanx-like construct, which had already infected and absorbed Mirage, in a bizarre attempt for survival and to recreate the likenesses of Warlock's allies in the New Mutants.

X-Men Disassembled

After most of the X-Men were jaunted to the Age of X-Man due to the calamitous actions of Nate Grey, Karma had been pressed into the services of O*N*E while under the effects of Warlock's techno-organic infection.  She, along with Mirage, Magik, Wolfsbane, Havok and Multiple Man, were rescued by Cyclops and Wolverine and helped re-form the X-Men.  Karma still felt extreme guilt over her harmful actions from New Mutants: Dead Souls and ultimately resigned from the team after confiding in Mirage.

War of the Realms

Karma aided the X-Men when Mirage rallied forces to resist the incursions of Malekith, who had launched his final campaign against Earth during his inter-realm war.

Krakoa

When most of the world's mutant population established themselves on Krakoa during the Dawn of X, Karma participated in the New Mutants' missions to space, and Carnelia.

Powers and abilities
Karma is a mutant telepath and empath with the ability to take possession of the minds and process the emotions of people and animals. She projects a psionic energy surge that overwhelms the consciousness of another sentient mind; rendering the victim unconscious while placing her own anima in command. It allows her to alter the victim's perceptions and memories, will people to fall asleep or divulge information, and operate their bodies as if they were an extension of her own.

Formerly when Karma first took possession of someone, she could only move her subject's body awkwardly until she acclimated herself to her new host. If she remained in possession of a host for too long she would begin to think and act as her host would, and eventually her own personality would become subordinate to one identical to the host's. Although Karma can possess multiple subjects simultaneously, her control over her subjects is fragmented as she shifts her attention from one to another.

Karma had also begun developing other telepathic abilities that were either latent or triggered by her possession by the Shadow King. By possessing others remotely, she can mentally "see" through their eyes. She is also able to use her power to disrupt other psi-signatures, protecting her from all manner of psychic assault. She is also an avid illusionist, able to combine powers with Moonstar in order to throw up a convincing mirage that could fool even Sabretooth's keen senses.

Karma is also a capable combatant with medieval weapons (particularly swords), due to the extended period of time she spent in Asgard. She is also familiar with first aid and firearms owing to her time in Vietnam. Shan would soon come to access the Hatchi Corporation heralded by her late half-sister, giving her access to multi-billion dollar resources in weapons tech amongst other utilities.

Reception

Accolades 
 In 2014, Entertainment Weekly ranked Karma 56th in their "Let's rank every X-Man ever" list.
 In 2014, BuzzFeed ranked Karma 37th in their "95 X-Men Members Ranked From Worst To Best" list.
 In 2018, CBR.com ranked Karma 14th in their "20 Most Powerful Mutants From The '80s" list.
 In 2019, CBR.com included Karma in their "Marvel's Most Powerful New Mutants" list.
 In 2020, Scary Mommy included Karma in their "Looking For A Role Model? These 195+ Marvel Female Characters Are Truly Heroic" list.
 In 2022, CBR.com ranked Karma 7th in their "X-Men: 10 Queer and Awesome Mutants" list.

Other versions

Age of Apocalypse 
In the Age of Apocalypse reality, Karma is Angel's assistant, helping him manage his nightclub Heaven, and keeping a neutral stance in the civil war between Apocalypse's loyal followers, openly resistant mutants, and the human population. Part of Karma's job is to use her mental powers to gather information from their guests, and also to make sure none would remember anything suspicious they might have witnessed. Eventually, Karma is kidnapped by Apocalypse's troops to be interrogated on matters regarding the X-Men. Karma keeps quiet as long as she can, but when the Shadow King is released on her, she gives away the desired information. She is then discarded outside Apocalypse's stronghold.

Learning of his assistant's fate, Angel searches for her. He is blinded by rage at the time, and when an Infinite guard calls out to him, he shoots the guard with his gun. Too late, though, he recognizes the guard's voice as Karma's. As he pulls her dying body from the suit of armor, she apologizes for having let him down.

Age of X
In the Age of X reality, Karma is a member of Danielle Moonstar's Cadre who serve as hunters for Fortress X. In this universe, she sports a mechanical leg.

Days of Future Past
In the Days of Future Tense continuity, inspired by the Days of Future Past, Karma is part of Pete Wisdom's resistance force in Great Britain in the year 2013. She only answers to her codename, and has apparently suffered terrible losses. Trying to cope with her situation, Karma displays a dark sense of humor and has refined her powers to the point where she can perceive things through a person's eyes without really possessing him or her.

House of M
In the House of M reality, Karma is a teacher at the New Mutant Leadership Institute. She is officially noted with S.H.I.E.L.D. for her pro-human sentiments, an unpopular opinion with the mutant ruling class. Karma and Cypher discover Laurie Collins and Sean Garrison are really working for S.H.I.E.L.D. as double agents and Tag takes him down before he tries to kill them.

Ultimate Marvel
The Ultimate Marvel version of Xuân Cao Mạnh is seen as a much darker character, working as one of S.H.I.E.L.D.'s Black Ops agents, codename: Karma. She is called in by Nick Fury to find out whether or not the President was being mind-controlled by Charles Xavier, based on his recent pro-mutant stand. Upon the request of the President, she is added as the final member of the government sponsored New Mutants to observe the group. She is later instrumental in gaining evidence against a high-ranking government official who is the head of the anti-mutant conspiracy, arresting both high-ranking officials involved in attacks on the 'New Mutants' on the Capitol steps. Whenever she uses her powers, her eyes glow a dark pink color.

X-Men: The End
Karma is seen fighting alongside the X-Men when Warskrulls invade the mansion.

In other media

Television 

 Karma makes a non-speaking cameo appearance in the X-Men: The Animated Series episode "Beyond Good and Evil (Part 4): End and Beginning" as one of Apocalypse's prisoners.

Notes

References

External links
 Karma at Marvel.com
 Spotlight on Karma at UncannyXmen.net 
 Gay League Profile

Asian-American superheroes
Characters created by Chris Claremont
Characters created by Frank Miller (comics)
Comics characters introduced in 1980
Fictional amputees
Fictional empaths
Fictional immigrants to the United States
Fictional lesbians
Fictional librarians
Fictional Vietnamese people
Marvel Comics characters who have mental powers
Marvel Comics female superheroes
Marvel Comics LGBT superheroes
Marvel Comics mutants
Marvel Comics orphans
Marvel Comics telepaths
New Mutants
Superhero schoolteachers
Twin characters in comics